Cardinal Antonelli may refer to:

 Giacomo Antonelli  (1806–1876), Italian cardinal deacon
 Ferdinando Giuseppe Antonelli (1896–1993), Italian Cardinal of the Catholic Church
 Ennio Antonelli (born 1936), Italian Cardinal of the Roman Catholic Church